Pedro Sousa was the defending champion but withdrew before the tournament began due to injury.

João Domingues won the title after defeating Facundo Bagnis 6–7(5–7), 6–2, 6–3 in the final.

Seeds
All seeds receive a bye into the second round.

Draw

Finals

Top half

Section 1

Section 2

Bottom half

Section 3

Section 4

References

External links
Main draw
Qualifying draw

Braga Open - Singles
Braga